Dead on Target may refer to:

Books
Dead on Target (The Hardy Boys)
Dead on Target, Thornton King series novel by Glyn Jones (South African writer)

Film and TV
Dead on Target (film)   a television based on the character of Derek Flint.
Dead on Target  1988 List of Hunter episodes